Bjørnø is a Danish island south of Funen. The island covers an area of 1.5 km2 and has 40 inhabitants. The island can be reached by ferry from Faaborg.

Islands of Denmark
Geography of Faaborg-Midtfyn Municipality